Koehler's gecko (Ancylodactylus koehleri) is a species of gecko, a lizard in the family Gekkonidae. The species is endemic to Central Africa.

Etymology
The specific name, koehleri, is in honor of Max Köhler who collected the holotype.

Geographic range
A. koehleri is found in Cameroon and Equatorial Guinea.

Reproduction
A. koehleri is oviparous.

References

Further reading
Chirio, Laurent; LeBreton, Matthew (2007). Atlas des reptiles du Cameroun. Paris: Muséum nationale d'histoire naturelle. 688 pp. . (in French).
Loveridge A (1947). "Revision of the African Lizards of the Family Gekkonidae". Bulletin of the Museum of Comparative Zoölogy at Harvard College 98 (1): 1-469 + Plates 1-7. ("Cnemaspis africanus köhleri [sic]", new combination, pp. 90–91).
Mertens R (1937). "Eine neue, tiergeographisch bemerkenswerte Eidechse aus Kamerun ". Senckenbergiana 19: 381-384. (Cnemaspis köhleri, new species). (in German).
Perret J-L (1986). "Révision des espèces africaines du Genre Cnemaspis Strauch, sous-genre Ancylodactylus Müller (Lacertilia, Gekkonidae), avec la description de quatre espèces nouvelles ". Revue suisse Zool. 93 (2): 457-505. (Cnemaspis koehleri, new status, pp. 477–480, Figures 17-18). (in French).

Ancylodactylus
Reptiles described in 1937